Kunar is one of the 34 provinces of Afghanistan, located in the northeastern part of the country. Its capital is Asadabad. Its population is estimated to be 508,224. Kunar's major political groups include Wahhabis or Ahl-e- Hadith, Nazhat-e Hambastagi Milli, Hezb-e Afghanistan Naween, Hezb-e Islami Gulbuddin.

It is one of the four "N2KL" provinces (Nangarhar Province, Nuristan Province, Kunar Province and Laghman Province). N2KL was the designation used by the US and Coalition Forces in Afghanistan for the rugged region along the Afghanistan–Pakistan border opposite Pakistan's Federally Administered Tribal Areas (merged in 2018 with Khyber Pakhtunkhwa). Kunar is the center of the N2KL region.

Geography

Kunar province is located in the northeast of Afghanistan. It borders with Nangarhar Province to the south, Nuristan Province to the north, Laghman Province to the west and has a border with Pakistan in the east. The province covers an area of 4339 km2. Nearly nine tenths (86%) of the province is mountainous or semi mountainous terrain while one eighth (12%) of the area is made up of relatively flat land. The primary geographic features of the province are the lower Hindu Kush mountains which are cut by the Kunar River to form the forested Kunar Valley. The river flows south and southwest from its source in the Pamir area and is part of the Indus River watershed via the Kabul River which it meets at Jalalabad. The Kunar is a primary draining conduit for the Hindu Kush basin and several tributaries, including the Pech, which form distinct and significant valleys in the area. The mountains, narrow valleys with steep walls, and rivers present formidable natural obstacles and have historically constrained all movement through the province. Even in the early 21st century, movement on foot, with pack animals, or with motorized vehicles is extremely limited and channeled due to the significant geographic restrictions.

History

Early history
The region has been part of many empires in the past, from the Seleucid Empire to the latest Afghan Durrani Empire. Many famous historical figures are believed to have visited the area, including Alexander the Great, Mahmud Ghaznavi, Xuanzang, Ibn Battuta, and others. Archaeologists have dated to AD 800–1000 a fortification system overlooking a Muslim cemetery at Chaga Serai (near the Pech-Kunar confluence).

Babur wrote about Kunar in Baburnama. He claimed that there was a shrine in Kunar of a preacher and poet Mir Sayyid Ali Hamadani, who is said to have died there in 1384 AD (786 AH). He also describes agricultural products: citron, oranges, coriander, orchards, strong yellow wines, and a burial custom wherein a woman whose corpse moved was considered to have done good things in life. He mentions Chaghan-Sarai as a small town, and describes the towns folk as Muslims who mixed with the Kafirs of nearby Kafiristan and followed some of their customs. He also claims to have later captured the town, even as the Pech river Kafirs tried to help the Chaghan Sarai residents repel his attack.

Walter Hamilton's writing in 1828 mentions that the padishah of Cooner was joined in alliance with the neighboring Kafirs (non Muslims) of Nuristan in battles against Muslim invaders. The Kafirs were forcibly converted by Abdur Rahman Khan in the 1890s.
 
Some British sources from the Great Game period (1800s) go into more detail about Kunar. For example, one from 1881 describes the various Kunar chiefs and their internecine wars, the conflict with Dost Mohammad Khan and their relations with the British. Names vary greatly, with Kunar sometimes being called Kama, or Kashkote, and the capital being listed as "Pashoot", which is not on modern maps.

An 1891 book described the Kunar region as split between the lower river area, controlled by Afghan chiefs, and the upstream area, where the Kunar river was actually referred to as the Chitral river. The major town of Chitral (in modern Pakistan) was the base of a badshah, who ruled under the Maharajah of Kashmir

20th century 

According to a US Army paper, the Pashtuns of Kunar and the Kafirs of Kunar/Nuristan eventually joined in the 20th century. Fundamentalist religion came to the region in the 1950s but the heavy unification happened during the Soviet–Afghan War (1979–88). Some of the first anti-government forces (lashkar) rose in the Kunar region.

Kerala, a town near Asadabad, was the site of the 1979 Kerala massacre, where the male population of a village was allegedly murdered by the People's Democratic Party of Afghanistan and its Soviet advisors.

Later, over ten-thousand Soviet and Afghan communist troops invaded the region, resulting in a massive refugee flow of the populace into Khyber Pakhtunkhwa, Pakistan. There were Spetsnaz units based in Asadabad (where the Pech meets the Kunar), in Jalalabad (where the Kunar meets the Kabul), and other towns. The major mujahideen groups had representation in the area, and were successful enough to confine the Communist troops for the most part to their fortifications in the major towns of the Kunar valley.

Eventually one of the Mujahideen leaders, Jamil al-Rahman, formed a movement that had a very strict interpretation of Islam, along the lines of Wahhabism and/or Salafism. He was supported by elements in Saudi Arabia, and later attracted many Saudis and Egyptians who had come to Afghanistan to fight Jihad.

When the Soviets left in 1988, the leader of the Mujahideen group Hizb-i-Islami, Gulbuddin Hekmatyar, began to fight with Jamil al-Rahman over control of the area. Hekmatyar was victorious and eventually his troops sacked Asadabad. By 1996 however, Mullah Omar's Taliban had invaded Kunar and driven out Hekmatyar.

21st century 

After the September 11 attacks of 2001, Afghanistan was invaded by United States and other NATO countries provided direct support to the Northern Alliance forces fighting the Taliban regime, which was quickly toppled and fled to remote areas. It was part of the War on Terror and to assist the new government that was led by Hamid Karzai.

During the 19th century British military expeditions, the 1980s Soviet occupation, and the latest conflict, Kunar has been a favoured spot of insurgent groups. Its impenetrable terrain, cave networks and border with the semi-autonomous Pakistani Khyber Pakhtunkhwa provides significant advantages for unconventional warfare and militant groups. The province is informally known as "Enemy Central" and "Indian Country" by Western armed forces serving in Afghanistan. Between January 2006 and March 2010 more than 65% of all insurgent incidents in Afghanistan occurred in Kunar province.

Like many of the mountainous eastern provinces of Afghanistan, the groups involved in armed conflict vary greatly in strength and purpose. Native Taliban forces mingle with foreign al-Qaeda fighters, while former mujahadeen militias, such as Hekmatyar's Hezb-e-Islami Gulbuddin, continue to operate as they did in the chaotic post-Soviet years. Another strong militia in the region is the Hezbi Islami faction of the late Mulavi Younas Khalis, who had his headquarters in neighboring Nuristan Province.

The province which is relatively small, was occupied by one of the highest concentrations of both US and Afghan security forces during the war. Special Operations Forces operated extensively throughout the area.

As of September 2015 the United States has awarded twelve Medals of Honor for actions in Afghanistan. Six of these have been awarded for actions in Kunar Province, and an additional four have been awarded for neighboring Nuristan Province.

Operation Mountain Resolve in 2003 involved the 10th Mountain Division air dropping into Nuristan and traveling dozens of kilometers, including in Kunar, to fight what was termed "Anti-Coalition Militia" (ACM) activity.

In 2005, Operation Red Wings set out with the intent to disrupt ACM activity in the region in order to further aid the stabilization efforts of the region for the upcoming September 18, 2005 Afghan National Parliamentary Elections. Anti-Coalition Militia activity in the region was carried out at the time most notably by a small group led by a local man named Ahmad Shah (from Nangarhar Province) who had aspirations of regional Islamic fundamentalist prominence, hence he and his small group would be one of the primary targets of the operation. A team of four Navy SEALs, tasked for surveillance and reconnaissance of a group of structures known to be used by Ahmad Shah and his men, fell into an ambush by Shah and his group just hours after inserting by fastrope from an MH-47 helicopter in the area. Three of the four SEALs were killed in the ambush; a quick reaction force helicopter sent in for their aid was subsequently shot down with an RPG-7 rocket propelled grenade by one of Shah's men, 19 American Forces were killed when their CH-47 Chinook helicopter was shot down, representing the second biggest loss of American forces since their invasion of the country.

According to Pakistan's Interior Minister Rehman Malik, Osama bin Laden was most likely hiding in Kunar Province in the spring and summer of 2009: "According to our information Osama is in Afghanistan, probably Kunar, as most of the activities against Pakistan are being directed from Kunar." Bin Laden was later found and killed in Abbottabad, Pakistan, contrary to what the Pakistani government had previously stated. He had been living there since 2005.

On 16 April 2022, Pakistani airstrikes and rocket attacks targeted the Chogam village of Shultan District, killing three girls, two boys, and one woman, and wounding one man.

Healthcare 

The percentage of households with clean drinking water increased from 24% in 2005 to 55% in 2011. The percentage of births attended to by a skilled birth attendant increased from 3% in 2005 to 13% in 2011.

Kunar province had 24 health clinics and a 123-bed hospital in 2008. According to data from 2008, the Ministry of Health employs 38 doctors and 121 other health professionals in the province. There are 93 pharmacies in the province. The majority of villages do not have a permanent health worker. Nearly a quarter of the population must travel more than 10 kilometers to reach the nearest health center.

Education

The overall literacy rate (6+ years of age) fell from 32% in 2005 to 20% in 2011. The overall net enrollment rate (6–13 years of age) increased from 43% in 2005 to 44% in 2011.

In Kunar province, the general literacy rate is 21%; however, although 47 percent of men are literate, only 18 percent of women are. Between the ages of six and thirteen, 43 percent of children are enrolled in school. In 2008, there were 129,661 pupils enrolled in the province's 332 primary, intermediate, and high schools. Boys made for 63 percent of students, while boys' schools accounted for 33 percent of all schools. In the schools, there were 3,268 teachers, with 5% of them being female. There is only one vocational school in the higher education sector that caters only to men.

Demographics

As of 2021, the population of the province is around 508,224 people. 98% are ethnic Pashtun and the remaining are Nuristani.

Around 96% of the population of Kunar lives in rural districts while 4% lives in urban areas.

11.8% of the population lived below the national poverty line, one of the lowest figures in Afghanistan

Kunar has a population of around 401,000 people in 2008. The province has 64,588 households, with an average of eight individuals per home. Rural districts are home to 96 percent of the population. Pashtun, Ashkun, Gawar-Bati, Gujari, Pashayi, and Waigali are the major ethnic groups of Kunar. Major tribes such as the Safi, Salarzai, Mashwani, Mamon, and Shinwari are included. More than 90% of the population speaks Pashtu, which is spoken in 705 villages out of 771. Dari and Uzbeki are spoken in two villages each, Pashaie in fifteen, and Nooristani in thirty-five. Kuchis (nomads) live in Kunar province, and their numbers fluctuate with the seasons. In the winter, 13,200 people, or 0.5 percent of the Kochi people population, stay in Kunar living in 20 communities. The Kochi people population in the summer is 1,355 individuals.

Districts
The districts in Kunar Province as of March 2009 are:

Reconstruction and international assistance

Asadabad hosts both an American Provincial Reconstruction Team at nearby Forward Operating Base Wright and a UNAMA development office.  Additionally, representatives of the United States Agency for International Development (USAID), US State and Agriculture Departments advise the local government. A US Army Agribusiness Development Team (ADT) was deployed to the province in late 2009.  Successive ADTs continue to serve in the province.

In media

The opening scenes of Marvel Cinematic Universe 2008 film Iron Man as well as S1E6 of What If...? take place in Kunar Province.

The 2010 documentary Restrepo was filmed in the Korengal Valley of Kunar Province.

The book Siren's Song: The Allure of War was published in 2012.  It depicts the story of an American platoon at COP Honaker Miracle, Pesh valley, Kunar Province.

The movie Lone Survivor starring Mark Wahlberg was based around "Operation Red Wings" in 2005 which was near Asadabad.

Documentary author James F. Christ has published numerous titles about the fighting in Kunar and Nuristan provinces, mainly from 2005 to 2007 with the 10th Mountain Division and Afghan National Army ETT advisors.

Journalist Wesley Morgan's 2021 book The Hardest Place: The American Military Adrift in Afghanistan's Pech Valley is a detailed history of American military operations in Kunar, specifically the Pech River Valley, from 2001 through 2020.

See also
 Arandu
 List of bridges in Konar Province
 Kabir Stori

References

External links

 
Provinces of Afghanistan
Provinces of the Islamic Republic of Afghanistan